Atiqullah is a male Muslim given name, formed from the elements Atiq, meaning ancient, and Allah, meaning of God. It may refer to:

 Atiqullah Atifmal (born 1957), Afghan diplomat
 Atiqullah Baryalai (born 1965), Afghan military officer
 Atiqullah Ludin, Afghan provincial governor, 2008–2013
 Atiqullah Raufi (?–2014), Afghan judicial administrator
 Atiq Ullah (footballer) (born 1983), Pakistani footballer
 Atiq Ullah (Kashmiri leader) (1872–1962), Indian Mirwaiz of Kashmir

See also
 Khwaja Atiqullah (1876–1945), British Indian politician